In mathematics, a system of bilinear equations is a special sort of system of polynomial equations, where each equation equates a bilinear form with a constant (possibly zero). More precisely, given two sets of variables represented as coordinate vectors  and y, then each equation of the system can be written   where,  is an integer whose value ranges from 1 to the number of equations, each  is a matrix, and each  is a real number. Systems of bilinear equations arise in many subjects including engineering, biology, and statistics.

See also
 Systems of linear equations

References
 Charles R. Johnson, Joshua A. Link 'Solution theory for complete bilinear systems of equations' - http://onlinelibrary.wiley.com/doi/10.1002/nla.676/abstract
 Vinh, Le Anh 'On the solvability of systems of bilinear equations in finite fields' - https://arxiv.org/abs/0903.1156
 Yang Dian 'Solution theory for system of bilinear equations' - https://digitalarchive.wm.edu/handle/10288/13726
  Scott Cohen and Carlo Tomasi. 'Systems of bilinear equations'. Technical report, Stanford, CA, USA, 1997.- ftp://reports.stanford.edu/public_html/cstr/reports/cs/tr/97/1588/CS-TR-97-1588.pdf

Equations